Moolboolaman is a rural locality in the Bundaberg Region, Queensland, Australia.

Geography 
Gin Gin–Mount Perry–Monto Road runs through from east to south-west.

History 
The locality takes its name from the parish, which is presumed to take its name from the pastoral run, which in turn is an Aboriginal word, meaning dead European man.

The first 65 kilometre section of the Mount Perry railway line from North Bundaberg railway station (originally called Bundaberg station) to Moolboolaman railway station was opened on 19 July 1881.

In 1887,  of land were resumed from the Moolboolaman pastoral run. The land was offered for selection for the establishment of small farms on 17 April 1887.

Moolboolaman Provisional School opened circa 1892 and closed in 1902 due to low student numbers. It reopened in 1908 and on 1 January 1909 became Mooolboolaman State School.There was a temporary closure in 1910 and again in 1929–1930. In 1957, the school closed permanently. It was located immediately north of the Moolboolaman railway station on the Gin Gin Mount Perry Road.

Dalysford Provisional opened circa 1892. On 1 January 1909, it became Dalysford State School. It closed temporarily between late 1924 to circa April 1925 due to low student numbers. It closed permanently in 1927. It was located to the south-west of Dalysford railway station, off the Dalysford Road (approx ). Historically in Dalysford, it is now within the boundaries of present-day Moolboolaman.

References

Further reading

External links 

 

Bundaberg Region
Localities in Queensland